Solarallergy is a jazz and rock instrumental album by Black Frames. Black Frames is a collaborative project by Skerik, Mike Dillon, Earl Harvin and Brad Houser from 2002. The album was accompanied by a national tour. Between the musicians are long-time associations: Dillon and Harvin from Ten Hands and Billy Goat; Skerik, Houser and Dillon from Critters Buggin. Though Dillon and Harvin are primarily percussionists, for Solarallergy all members are credited for percussion. Each musician is also credited for composition.

Personnel
Skerik - tenor saxophone, marimba, fancy sax
Mike Dillon - vibes, marimba, tabla, percussion
Earl Harvin - drums, vibes, marimba, guitar
Brad Houser - bass, sentir, timpani

Tracks
25 Billion Stars Per Human (Dillon, Harvin)
French Farse (Harvin)
Hafta (Dillon)
Sonic Vapor (Skerik, Houser)
Mallet Cut (Dillon)
Turbulance (Dillon)
White Envelopes (Harvin)
Gophers (Dillon, Harvin)
Lucky Dog (Houser)

References
Liner notes
Black Frames, Cheap Shades & Solar Flares Dennis Cook, JamBase, 23 October 2002 Retrieved October 4, 2007
Mike Dillon: A Mallet Cut Above Dennis Cook, JamBase, 13 December 2002 Retrieved October 4, 2007

2002 albums
Jazz albums by American artists